Stracciatella is a term used for three different types of Italian food:

Stracciatella (soup), an egg drop soup popular in central Italy
Stracciatella (ice cream), a gelato variety with chocolate flakes, inspired by the soup
Stracciatella di bufala, a variety of soft  Italian cheese from the Apulia region using  Italian buffalo milk.

Italian words and phrases